The Matador Gigant, initially called Matador, is a self-propelled combine harvester produced by the German agricultural company Claas in Harsewinkel. The Matador Gigant is the largest combine harvester of the Matador series, the smaller Matador Standard was introduced afterwards. Approximately 35,000 units of the Matador series combine harvester were made from 1961 to 1969.

Concept and Production 

The Matador succeeded the Selbstfahrer, which went into series production in 1953. On average, the threshrate amounts . Back in 1963, Claas sold the Matador Gigant for DM 34,130. Most of the produced combine harvesters were exported.

For the series production of the Matador Gigant, Claas made structural alterations to the production line in Harsewinkel, the harvesters were now assembled diagonally to let transport vehicles cross the production line. At the end of the production line, the harvesters were tested in three steps. Smaller combine harvesters were produced on a separate production line.

Technical specifications

Bibliography 

Operating manual Claas Matador Gigant. Late 1960s
Manfred Baedecker, Ralf Lenge: Die Claas Mähdrescher Story. 2nd Edition. Landwirtschaftsverlag, Hiltrup 2003, p. 64–67.
Claas Matador Gigant brochure. July 1965

References 

Harvesters
Claas